S.S. Lazio finished 9th in Serie A this season.

Squad

Goalkeepers
  Valerio Fiori
  Fernando Orsi

Defenders
  Cristiano Bergodi
  Paolo Beruatto
  Angelo Gregucci
  Marco Monti
  Massimo Piscedda
  Massimiliano Nardecchia
  Raffaele Sergio
  Roberto Soldà

Midfielders
  Oberdan Biagioni
  Andrea Icardi
  Alessandro Manetti
  Franco Marchegiani
  Davide Olivares
  Gabriele Pin
  Claudio Sclosa
  Pedro Troglio

Attackers
  Amarildo
  Rubén Sosa
  Paolo Di Canio
  Alessandro Bertoni

Competitions

Serie A

League table

Matches

Topscorers
  Amarildo 8
  Rubén Sosa 8
  Gabriele Pin 6
  Paolo Di Canio 3

Coppa Italia

First round

Second round

References
 

S.S. Lazio seasons
Lazio